Li Wei (born 12 October 1961) is a former Chinese speed skater who participated in the 1984 Winter Olympics where he finished in 40th (5000 m) and 38th (1500 m) place.

References

Chinese male speed skaters
1961 births
Living people
Olympic speed skaters of China
Sportspeople from Jilin
Speed skaters at the 1984 Winter Olympics
20th-century Chinese people